Yaeger is a surname. Notable people with the surname include:

Bradley Yaeger (born 1985), Canadian ice dancer
Edgar Yaeger (1904–1997), American modernist painter from Detroit, Michigan
Gordon Yaeger who piloted the Bell Rocket Belt at the 1964 New York World Fair and in the James Bond movie Thunderball
Larry Yaeger (1950), former Apple Distinguished Scientist, currently Full Professor of Informatics at Indiana University Bloomington
Lynn Yaeger, former fashion reporter for The Village Voice, having worked for the paper for 30 years
Morgan Yaeger (born 1998), Australian women's basketball player

See also
Lake Lou Yaeger, 1,300-acre (5.2 km2) reservoir located in Montgomery County, Illinois
Yaeger Lake, a lake in Minnesota